José Javier 'Javi' Rubio Gómez (born 16 November 1984) is a Spanish footballer who plays as a midfielder.

Club career
Born in Torrent, Valencia, Rubio graduated from local club Valencia CF, making his debut as a senior with the reserves in the 2003–04 season, in Tercera División. In the summer of 2004 he joined neighbouring Villarreal CF, initially being assigned to the B side also in the fourth division; he made his first and only La Liga appearance with the main squad on 22 April 2006, starting in a 0–2 home defeat against Real Sociedad.

The following six years, Rubio competed in Segunda División B, representing Racing Club Portuense, Ontinyent CF (two stints), Real Murcia Imperial, Deportivo Alavés, Huracán Valencia CF and CD Alcoyano.

References

External links
 
 
 
 

1984 births
Living people
Spanish footballers
Footballers from the Valencian Community
Association football midfielders
La Liga players
Segunda División B players
Tercera División players
Valencia CF Mestalla footballers
Villarreal CF B players
Villarreal CF players
Ontinyent CF players
Real Murcia Imperial players
Deportivo Alavés players
Huracán Valencia CF players
CD Alcoyano footballers
Atlético Saguntino players
CD Castellón footballers